Vladimir Mikhaylov may refer to:

 Vladimir Alekseyevich Mikhaylov (born 1939), Russian football player and coach
 Vladimir Sergeyevich Mikhaylov (born 1943), Russian air force general